The McCarran Amendment, 43 U.S.C. § 666 (1952) is a federal law enacted by the United States Congress in 1952 which waives the United States' sovereign immunity in suits concerning ownership or management of water rights. It amended Chapter 15 (Appropriation of Waters; Reservoir Sites) of Title 43 (Public Lands) of the United States Code. The McCarran Amendment gives others the right to join in such a lawsuit as a defendant. Prior to the Amendment, sovereign immunity kept the United States from being joined in any suits. The Amendment enabled suits concerning federal water rights to be tried in state courts.

Text

Background
While the original amendment specified that state courts only held concurrent jurisdiction in state and federal district courts in water rights adjudication cases under the McCarran Act, the case Colorado River Water Conservation District v. United States, 424 U.S. 800 (1976) specified that all water rights adjudication cases must originate in state court, though they can be appealed later to federal courts.

Many Indian legal scholars hoped the McCarran Act would not require origination in state courts in the Western states that joined the union late and were held under a "disclaimer clause," however the Supreme Court found that the Colorado River Water Conservation District case applied to all states in the 1985 Arizona v. San Carlos Apache Tribe case.

This case had an extraordinary effect on the adjudication of Indian reserved water rights, though some legal scholars argue that it was never intended to apply to Indian reservations. Elizabeth McCallister argued in 1976 American Indian Law Review article that legislative history shows proponents of the bill were more concerned with adjudication of individual water rights against the United States, rather than claims against Indian reservations. In fact, the acting secretary of the Interior at the time argued such a law should only be enacted if it explicitly excluded Indian reservations.

As a result of the McCarran Amendment and subsequent test cases, many Indian tribes have opted to quantify reserved water rights through negotiations rather than outright adjudication, as water rights adjudication in state court has often held poor results for tribes, and has proven very costly.

References

Water law in the United States
United States federal judiciary legislation
United States federal public land legislation